The Solomon Islands rain forests are a terrestrial ecoregion covering most of the Solomon Islands archipelago.

Geography
Included are the islands of Bougainville and Buka, which are part of Papua New Guinea and most of the islands within the nation of Solomon Islands. Excluded are the eastern islands of the nation of Solomon Islands, the Santa Cruz Islands, which lie in the Vanuatu rain forests ecoregion together with the neighbouring archipelago of Vanuatu. Both ecoregions are part of the Australasian realm, which also includes the neighbouring Bismarck Archipelago and New Guinea, as well as New Caledonia, Australia and New Zealand.

The Solomon Islands rain forests are a tropical and subtropical moist broadleaf forests ecoregion, also known as a tropical rainforest.

Flora
The natural vegetation of the Solomon archipelago consists of lowland and montane tropical forests. The major plant communities include coastal strand, mangrove forests, freshwater swamp forests, lowland rain forests, and montane rain forest. Seasonally-dry forests and grasslands are found on the northern (leeward) slopes of Guadalcanal.

Fauna

The islands are home to 47 native mammal species, including bats, murid rodents, and possums, gliders, and cuscuses. 26 species are endemic or near-endemic – 17 species of bats, and nine species of murid rodent.

199 bird species are native to the Solomon archipelago, of which 69 species are endemic. The ecoregion corresponds to the Solomon group endemic bird area.

Conservation and threats
The rainforests of this region are under threat as the governments of both Papua New Guinea and Solomon Islands rely on logging for revenue, plan to expand farm land and to develop roads.

External links

 Solomon group endemic bird area (BirdLife International)

References

Australasian ecoregions
Ecoregions of Papua New Guinea
Ecoregions of the Solomon Islands
Environment of the Solomon Islands

Geography of the Autonomous Region of Bougainville
Geography of the Solomon Islands
Natural history of Papua New Guinea
Solomon Islands (archipelago)
Tropical and subtropical moist broadleaf forests
Endemic Bird Areas
Natural history of Bougainville Island